Sveta Helena (often abbreviated Sv. Helena) is a naselje (settlement) in the town of Sveti Ivan Zelina in Zagreb County, Croatia, population 366 (2011 census). It is best known for the highway interchange of A4 highway and D10 expressway it houses. A highway node where in December 2008 Outlet center Sveta Helena was open and after two years shut down.

References 

Populated places in Zagreb County